Rambukkana Railway Station is a railway station in the Kegalle District, Sabaragamuwa Province, Sri Lanka. The station is served by Sri Lanka Railways, which is the state-run railway operator.

The line was originally double-tracked from Colombo to Rambukkana in 1933 however the section between Polgahawela and Rambukkana was reduced to a single track in 1940 after a bridge on the line was washed away. This section was only re-instated as double track in 1998, as a result of an increasing numbers of passengers alighting at the station to visit the nearby Pinnawala Elephant Orphanage.

Continuity

See also 
List of railway stations in Sri Lanka
List of railway stations in Sri Lanka by line
Sri Lanka Railways

References 

Railway stations in Kegalle District
Railway stations on the Main Line (Sri Lanka)